The pale-billed hornbill (Lophoceros pallidirostris) is a species of hornbill in the family Bucerotidae. It is found in Angola, DRC, Kenya, Malawi, Mozambique, Tanzania, and Zambia.

References

pale-billed hornbill
Birds of Southern Africa
pale-billed hornbill
Taxonomy articles created by Polbot